King's County was a parliamentary constituency in Ireland, represented in the House of Commons of the United Kingdom. It returned two Members of Parliament (MPs) from 1801 to 1885 and one from 1918 to 1922.

Boundaries
This constituency comprised the whole of King's County now known as County Offaly.

Members of Parliament

MPs 1801–1885

MPs 1918–1922

Elections
 Note: Turnout estimated by dividing votes cast by 2. This will underestimate turnout to the extent that electors only used one of their two possible votes. Where there are two seats available but one party fields just one candidate, the turnout is estimated as the sum of the highest vote for each party. This method may overestimate turnout.

Elections in the 1830s

Elections in the 1840s

Fitzsimon resigned by accepting the office of Steward of the Chiltern Hundreds, causing a by-election.

Elections in the 1850s

Elections in the 1860s

Elections in the 1870s

Elections in the 1880s

 

 Constituency abolished 1885 and re-created as a single member constituency 1918

Elections in the 1910s

 Constituency abolished 1922

References

Historic constituencies in County Offaly
Westminster constituencies in King's County (historic)
Dáil constituencies in the Republic of Ireland (historic)
Constituencies of the Parliament of the United Kingdom established in 1801
Constituencies of the Parliament of the United Kingdom disestablished in 1885
Constituencies of the Parliament of the United Kingdom established in 1918
Constituencies of the Parliament of the United Kingdom disestablished in 1922